Ismail Mačev (Macedonian: Исмаил Мачев; 3 January 1960 – 21 January 2019) was a Macedonian sprinter who competed for Yugoslavia in the 400 metres. He took part in the 1988 Summer Olympics as well as two World Championships. In addition, he won a silver medal at the 1987 Mediterranean Games.

International competitions

Personal bests
Outdoors
200 metres – 21.5 (Skopje 1981)
400 metres – 45.83 (Ljubljana 1987)
800 metres – 1:47.46 (Sarajevo 1988)
Indoors
200 metres – 22.05 (Budapest 1987)
400 metres – 47.11 (Budapest 1990)

Death
Mačev died of lung cancer on 21 January 2019 in Belgrade, Serbia.

References

All-Athletics

1960 births
2019 deaths
Sportspeople from Skopje
Yugoslav male sprinters
Macedonian male sprinters
World Athletics Championships athletes for Yugoslavia
Athletes (track and field) at the 1988 Summer Olympics
Olympic athletes of Yugoslavia
Mediterranean Games silver medalists for Yugoslavia
Athletes (track and field) at the 1983 Mediterranean Games
Athletes (track and field) at the 1987 Mediterranean Games
Athletes (track and field) at the 1991 Mediterranean Games
Mediterranean Games medalists in athletics
Universiade silver medalists for Yugoslavia
Universiade medalists in athletics (track and field)
Medalists at the 1987 Summer Universiade
Deaths from lung cancer
Deaths from cancer in Serbia